Tashlultum was a wife of King Sargon of Akkad. Her name is known to archaeology only from a single shard of an alabaster vase or bowl with an inscription indicating it was dedicated to the temple by her steward.

From this, it has been assumed (for lack of any conflicting information) that she was queen of Akkad and the mother of Sargon's children Enheduanna, Rimush, Manishtushu, Shu-Enlil and Ilaba'is-takal.

References 

 
 

24th-century BC women
23rd-century BC women
Akkadian people
Ancient queens consort
24th-century BC births
23rd-century BC deaths
Ancient Mesopotamian women
Akkadian Empire
23rd-century BC people